Harry Malone may refer to:

Harry Malone, character in Harriers
Harry Malone, character in 40 Guns to Apache Pass
Harry Malone, character in CI5: The New Professionals

See also 
 Malone